Xavier Antich i Valero (La Seu d'Urgell, 1962) is a Spanish philosopher, writer and university professor from Catalonia. He is a professor of aesthetics at the University of Girona. He chaired the board of the Tàpies Foundation between 2011 and 2022. Since Feb 2022 he is the President of Catalan Civil Association Òmnium Cultural.

Biography 
Born in La Seu d’Urgell, son of a bookseller and a teacher. Extraordinary Degree Award (1985) and PhD in Philosophy from the University of Barcelona, with a doctoral thesis on the Metaphysics of Aristotle (1997). He works as Professor of History of Aesthetic Ideas and Art Theory at the University of Girona. He has been a visiting chair at Stanford University and a visiting professor at The Universidade Católica Portuguesa. From 2011 to 2022, he chaired the board of the Tàpies Foundation. On feb 26, 2022 we was appointed President of Òmnium Cultural, a non-profit cultural organisation founded in 1961 with more than 190,000 members and 52 local branches in Catalonia.

Works 

 Introducción a la metafísica de Aristóteles. El problema del objeto en la filosofía primera. Barcelona: PPU (1990). 
 El rostre de l'altre. Passeig filosòfic per l'obra d'Emmanuel Lévinas. València: Eliseu Climent Editor (Premi Joan Fuster d'assaig) (1993). .
 L'umanesimo di Lévinas e l'incontro a Davos, Idee (1994) pp. 91–96 
 Antoni Tàpies. Certeses sentides. Cracòvia: Kraków National Museum, Instituto Cervantes
 Barcelona, 1917-1928. Del 391 al Manifest Groc, dins: AAVV, Capitales del arte moderno. Madrid: Instituto de Cultura, Fundación Mapfre (2007).
 Ver para mirar. De la imagen-control a la imagen-deseo, dins: AAVV, Cuerpo y mirada. Huellas del siglo XX. Madrid: Museo Nacional Centro de Arte Reina Sofía (2007).
 Per què necessitem les humanitats? Conviure amb els clàssics per viure el present. Barcelona: ESADE / CEJP (2013).
 La ciutat del dissens. Espai comú i pluralitat. Barcelona: CCCB (2013).
 La voluntat de comprendre. Barcelona: Arcàdia (2016)
 Dos assaigs sobre fotografia (Arcàdia i Gg, 2019)

References 

Living people
1962 births
Philosophers from Catalonia
Academic staff of the University of Girona
People from La Seu d'Urgell